Crescent Lake (formerly Rattlesnake Pond) receives drainage from Coffee Pond and Dumpling Pond in northern Casco, Maine, and extends south into Raymond. The town of Raymond maintains a boat ramp on Maine State Route 85 at the south end of Crescent Lake. Smallmouth bass, largemouth bass, chain pickerel, and white perch thrive in the lake. Dissolved oxygen deficiency below the  summer thermocline limits suitability for cold-water fish; but the lake supports populations of cusk and rainbow smelt.

Sources

Lakes of Cumberland County, Maine
Casco, Maine
Raymond, Maine
Lakes of Maine